The 2007–08 Tottenham Hotspur season was the club's 16th season in the Premier League, their 29th successive season in the top division of the English football league system and their 125th year overall.

Spurs had finished fifth in the previous season's Premier League, thereby qualifying for the UEFA Cup. They then progressed to the last 16 of the competition to face PSV. After the two rounds and one away goal each, Spurs were finally eliminated 6–5 on penalties.

In the FA Cup, Spurs were eliminated by Manchester United in the fourth round, losing 3–1. This was also the season where Tottenham won the League Cup, beating Chelsea 2–1 at Wembley Stadium. Their victory remains the team's last official trophy, as of 2023, although they've been close to ending the drought, most notably in the 2019 UEFA Champions League Final.

Pre-season and friendlies
During the 2007 summer transfer period Tottenham added centre-back Younès Kaboul from Auxerre for £8 million, followed by striker Darren Bent for a club record fee of £16.5 million. This was also the season that Spurs acquired Gareth Bale from Southampton for £5 million. Additional signings included Danny Rose from Leeds United and Kevin-Prince Boateng from Hertha BSC.

Departing the club was Egyptian footballer Mido. He initially arrived on an 18-month loan deal from Roma in January 2005 and in 2006 signed a permanent deal; on 16 August 2007, he was sold to Middlesbrough for £6 million. Also departing was Reto Ziegler, who was loaned out to Sampdoria in Italy for the second half of the 2006–07 season. Sampdoria subsequently signed him permanently from Spurs for an undisclosed fee.

Friendlies

2007–08 season
Tottenham started off their Premier League campaign away at promoted Sunderland with a 1–0 loss. Three days later they travelled to Everton, losing 3–1, then back at White Hart Lane recorded their first win, 4–0 against Derby County. After that Tottenham recorded four draws and three defeats in the Premier League, which included a 3–3 draw away to Fulham and a 4–4 draw against Aston Villa. In the UEFA Cup first round Spurs won 6–1 against Cypriot club Anorthosis, then followed up with a 1–1 draw away in Cyprus. Manager Martin Jol's final Premier League game was on 22 October, a 3–1 away loss at Newcastle United. On 25 October, in the UEFA Cup, Spurs hosted Getafe, losing 2–1. Following the match, it was announced that Jol had been sacked.

After one match with Clive Allen and Alex Inglethorpe in charge, Juande Ramos was hired as Jol's replacement, having previously managed Sevilla. Alongside Ramos, Gus Poyet was handed the assistant head coaching role. Marcos Álvarez, who worked alongside Ramos at Sevilla, also joined the backroom staff, as fitness coach. Tottenham chairman Daniel Levy was widely criticised for his treatment of Jol following revelations that Ramos was approached to replace Jol during the summer, which many thought undermined his leadership and ruined his credibility as an authoritative figure.

Ramos' reign began with a 2–0 win over Blackpool in the League Cup. Immediately following Ramos' appointment, it was made clear in the public forum that he was very unhappy with the fitness of the team and instigated a new diet and fitness regime. Tottenham's league form began to improve and their progress in the League Cup began with a 2–0 win over Manchester City, which ended City's unbeaten home record.

On 27 January 2008, Spurs went out of the FA Cup in the fourth round to a 3–1 defeat at the hands of Manchester United at Old Trafford. Tottenham took the lead through Robbie Keane but eventually lost to United to a goal from Carlos Tevez and two goals from Cristiano Ronaldo, one of which was a penalty where Michael Dawson was sent off for a deliberate handball.

Tottenham's run in the League Cup continued with a semi-final first leg 1–1 draw against Arsenal at Emirates Stadium; a 5–1 win over Arsenal at White Hart Lane followed, resulting in a 6–2 Spurs aggregate victory. This booked a place in the final against Chelsea. Tottenham went on to win the match 2–1 thanks to a Jonathan Woodgate header in extra time, securing Tottenham's first trophy since 1999. It also guaranteed them UEFA Cup qualification for the third season running.

On 13 March 2008, Tottenham were eliminated from the UEFA Cup in the last 16 round by PSV. The first leg played at White Hart Lane was a 1–0 defeat for Spurs following a mistake from Gilberto. Dimitar Berbatov scored in the second leg away at the Philips Stadion to take the game to extra time and subsequently penalties. Here, Tottenham lost 6–5 when Pascal Chimbonda missed his kick.

On 22 March 2008, Spurs played Portsmouth, winning 2–0. Darren Bent struck the 100th goal of the 2007–08 Premier League campaign. Jamie O'Hara followed two minutes later with the club's 101st. BBC sport writer Ian Hughes noted that Tottenham have "an average of 3.63 goals in every Spurs game this season".

After earning a point on 19 April in a 1–1 draw against Wigan Athletic, Tottenham secured their mathematical safety in the Premier League after reaching 42 points. Berbatov's sixth-minute strike was Tottenham's 100th in all competitions that season, 64 in the Premier League and 36 in cup competitions. The season ended on 11 May 2008 with a 2–0 home defeat to Liverpool.

Premier League table

Season honours
League Cup: 2007–08

Team kit
The team kit for the 2007–08 season was produced by Puma. The main shirt sponsor was Mansion, an Internet gambling establishment. A special 125th anniversary commemorative kit was produced for a match against Aston Villa.

Transfers

In

Out

Loaned out

Squad list

Injury list

Match results

Premier League

H/A = Home/Away
Final updated: 11 May 2008

FA Cup

Eliminated

H/A = Home/Away

Final update: 27 February 2008

League Cup

Champions

H/A = Home/Away

Final update: 27 February 2008

UEFA Cup

First round and group stage

Group G final standings

Knockout Rounds

Eliminated

H/A = Home/Away

Final update: 13 March 2008

Statistics

Appearances

Goal scorers 

The list is sorted by shirt number when total goals are equal.

Clean sheets

The list is sorted by shirt number when total clean sheets are equal.

Head coach statistics
Stats correct as of the end of the season

References

Tottenham Hotspur F.C. seasons
Tottenham Hotspur